Dallas is an American prime time television soap opera that follows the wealthy Ewings, a family of oil and cattle ranch industrialists in Dallas, Texas. Cynthia Cidre developed the 2012 continuation of the  1978 series of the same name, created by David Jacobs, that picks up twenty years after the series ended in 1991. The continuation series premiered on TNT on June 13, 2012, and stars Jesse Metcalfe, Josh Henderson, Jordana Brewster, Julie Gonzalo, Brenda Strong, Patrick Duffy, and Linda Gray, with Larry Hagman.

Upon its cancellation in October 2014, the Dallas continuation series had aired for three seasons and forty episodes.

Series overview

Episodes

Season 1 (2012)

Season 2 (2013)

Season 3 (2014) 
On April 30, 2013, TNT renewed Dallas for a 15-episode third season.  The first eight episodes of season 3 were broadcast from February 24, 2014 to April with the remaining seven from August 18, 2014.

Ratings

Season 1

Season 2

Season 3

References

External links 
 
 

Dallas
Dallas 2012
Dallas (TV franchise)